Jesse Powell is the eponymous debut studio album by American R&B singer Jesse Powell.

Critical reception

Allmusic editor Craig Lytle found that "the CD is mixed with midtempo new jack swing rhythms and laid-back ballads that all sound consistent with each other. As Powell's vocals mature, his delivery should become smoother."

Track listing

Sample credits
"All I Need" contains samples from 1979's "Just a Touch of Love" by Slave.
"Spend the Night (It's Alright)" contains samples from "Do Your Thing" by Isaac Hayes.
"I Like" contains samples from 1980's "I'm Back for More" by Al Johnson and Jean Carne.
"Gloria" contains samples from 1976's "Gloria" and 1978's "It's You That I Need" by Enchantment.

Personnel 

Judi Acosta-Stewart – Project Coordinator  
Gerald Albright – Saxophone  
Craig Burbidge – Mixing  
Buster – Producer, Programming  
Gordon Chambers – Vocal Arrangement, backing vocals
Kevin "KD" Davis – Mixing  
John Frye – Assistant Engineer    
Thom "TK" Kidd – Engineer  
Keri Lewis – Arranger, Drum Programming, Fiddle, Keyboards, Producer  
Lisa Michelle – Stylist  
Kevin Lively – Assistant Engineer  
Kevin Parker – Assistant Engineer  
Catrina Powell – backing vocals  
Jacob Powell – backing vocals  
Jesse Powell – Primary Artist, Vocal Arrangement, backing vocals  
Tamara Powell – Unknown Contributor Role  
Ricky K. – Bass
Timothy Christian Riley – Keyboards  
Carl Roland – Guitar, Multi-instruments, Producer, Programming  

Greg Royal – Editing   
Shavoni – Producer, Programming  
Louis Silas, Jr. – Executive Producer  
Rea Ann Silva – Make-Up  
Daryl Simmons – Drum Programming, Keyboards, Producer, Vocal Arrangement    
Ivy Skoff – Project Coordinator    
Alvin Speights – Mixing  
Ralph Stacy – Bass   
Laney Stewart – Engineer, Producer, Programming, Rhythm Arrangements, Sequencing, Vocal Arrangement   
Michael Stokes – Arranger, Engineer, Mixing, Producer, Programming  
Tone – Drum Programming, Mixing, Producer  
Richard Travali – Mixing  
Ilene Weingard – Art Direction, Design  
Emerald Williams – backing vocals  
Stokley Williams – Drums, backing vocals

Charts

References

External links
 

1996 debut albums
Jesse Powell albums
Silas Records albums
MCA Records albums